The Lockspeiser LDA-01 ("Land Development Aircraft") was a British seven-tenths scale research and development tandem wing aircraft, which was designed and built by test pilot and engineer David Lockspeiser to prove a concept for a low-cost utility transport.

Design and development
The LDA-01 was a single-seat tandem-wing monoplane, fabric covered with metal construction. The foreplane had a common design to the separately-made port and starboard wings of the main plane, giving it half the area. The intention was to reduce the number of spare parts needed by re-using the same wing component interchangeably in each location. The main wings were mounted at the rear-end of the box structure fuselage and the fore wing was attached underneath the front. The fuselage was fitted initially with a four-wheeled landing gear and was designed to be fitted with a detachable payload container to allow easy conversion between roles. The landing gear was changed later in development to a more conventional tricycle configuration. It was powered by a rear-mounted pusher engine. The LDA-01 G-AVOR first flew on 24 August 1971 at Wisley in Surrey, under the power of an 85 hp (63 kW) Continental C85 piston engine, but was later refitted with a more powerful Lycoming O-320 engine.

The aircraft (which by this time had been re-registered G-UTIL), and had been renamed the Boxer 500, was being modified to planned production configuration by Brooklands Aerospace at Old Sarum Airfield when it was destroyed in a fire on 16 January 1987.

Specifications (LDA-01)

References

External links

 

1970s British experimental aircraft
Single-engined pusher aircraft
Aircraft first flown in 1971
Tandem-wing aircraft
High-wing aircraft
Twin-tail aircraft